Maricopa Wells is a former place (locale) situated in Pinal County, Arizona. Historically, it was an oasis around a series of watering holes in the Sierra Estrella, eight miles north of present-day Maricopa, Arizona, and about a mile west of Pima Butte. It developed as a trading center and stopping place for travelers in the mid to late 19th century.

History
Maricopa Wells was a watering place named by travelers on the Southern Emigrant Trail who used it as a stopping place on the trail. They could rest and feed and water their animals. They traded with the nearby Maricopa and Pima natives for crops produced in their fields, which they irrigated by the Gila River. A settlement developed here when it was the base for the large stage station for the San Antonio-San Diego Mail Line and Butterfield Overland Mail, and later stage companies. At one time this was the primary military telegraph post for all of Arizona Territory. Following the American Civil War a traveller's guide to the American West published in 1866 reported that it was 411 miles from San Diego Barracks to Oatman Flat via the roads of the day.

Maricopa Wells was abandoned after the Maricopa and Phoenix Railway constructed a route north through Tempe to Phoenix. Maricopaville was planned as a terminus before Tempe won a spot on the line that was constructed. The settlement moved east to what developed as Maricopa Junction, known as Maricopa.

See also
 Battle of Pima Butte
 Sacate, Arizona

References

External links
  Google Map: Maricopa Wells, Arizona
  Maricopa Wells and the Butterfield Overland Stage Here
  Topographic map of Maricopa Wells, Arizona, from  www.topoquest.com
 Maricopa Wells – ghosttowns.com

Butterfield Overland Mail in New Mexico Territory
San Antonio–San Diego Mail Line
Maricopa Wells, Arizona
Stagecoach stops in the United States